Adam Richard Deadmarsh (born May 10, 1975) is a Canadian-born American former professional ice hockey player who played in the NHL with the Quebec Nordiques, Colorado Avalanche and the Los Angeles Kings. Deadmarsh was later a video coordinator and assistant coach with the Avalanche, before concussion issues forced him to step down after the  season, nine years after his playing career ended for the same reason.

Playing career

Deadmarsh was drafted by the Quebec Nordiques in the 1993 NHL Entry Draft, first round, fourteenth overall, from the Portland Winterhawks of the Western Hockey League. He played for the Avalanche team that won the Stanley Cup in 1996. His name was initially misspelled "Deadmarch" on the Cup, but was later corrected; it was the first time a misspelling on the Stanley Cup had ever been corrected.  He was traded to the Los Angeles Kings on February 21, 2001 along with Aaron Miller, a player to be named later (Jared Aulin), and Colorado's first round pick in the 2001 NHL Entry Draft (Dave Steckel) for Rob Blake and Steve Reinprecht.

Among his final accomplishments in the NHL, Deadmarsh became a playoff hero for vaulting the Kings past the heavily favoured Detroit Red Wings in round one of the 2001 Stanley Cup Playoffs, after trailing late in Game 4 by three goals while his team was already down two games to one.  Los Angeles went on to lose in the conference semifinals to his former team, the Avalanche, in seven games; the Avalanche would eventually win their second Stanley Cup.

A U.S. citizen by virtue of having an American mother, Deadmarsh played for Team USA in the 1996 World Cup of Hockey, the 1998 Winter Olympics, and the 2002 Winter Olympics, winning a gold medal in 1996 and a silver medal in 2002.

After missing the most of the 2002–03 NHL season and the entire 2003–04 NHL season due to two concussions (and the next season due to the NHL lockout), Deadmarsh (unofficially) announced his retirement on September 22, 2005 citing the previous concussion as an inability to play further.  He was honored on March 20, 2006 before a game between the Avalanche and Kings at Staples Center in downtown Los Angeles, California for his dedication to both teams.

He had previously played junior hockey for the Portland Winter Hawks in the Western Hockey League and was a 3 time member of the U.S. National Junior Team, where he shares the all-time U.S. record of 21 games played at the World Junior Ice Hockey Championships. He resides in Idaho with his wife and twin daughters.

Adam is a second cousin of former NHL player Butch Deadmarsh.

Career statistics

Regular season and playoffs

International

Awards and honors

References

External links
 

1975 births
American men's ice hockey right wingers
Canadian ice hockey right wingers
Canadian emigrants to the United States
Colorado Avalanche coaches
Colorado Avalanche players
Sportspeople from Trail, British Columbia
Ice hockey people from British Columbia
Ice hockey players at the 1998 Winter Olympics
Ice hockey players at the 2002 Winter Olympics
Living people
Los Angeles Kings players
Medalists at the 2002 Winter Olympics
National Hockey League first-round draft picks
Olympic silver medalists for the United States in ice hockey
Portland Winterhawks players
Quebec Nordiques draft picks
Quebec Nordiques players
Stanley Cup champions